Bernard Montgomery Muir (born July 22, 1968) is an American college athletics administrator who is currently the athletic director at Stanford University. Prior to Stanford, Muir served in the same position at the University of Delaware and Georgetown University.

Early life and education
Born in Gainesville, Florida, Muir attended Brown University, where he earned a bachelor's degree in organizational behavior and management and played basketball, serving as the team's co-captain in his senior year. He went on to earn a master's degree in sports administration from Ohio University.

Sports administration career
Muir worked as assistant director of the NCAA Men's Division I Basketball Championship and then joined the staff of Notre Dame athletic director Kevin White. In 2005, Muir was named athletic director at Georgetown University, and in 2009, was hired in the same position at the University of Delaware.

In 2012, following the departure of Bob Bowlsby to head the Big 12 Conference, Stanford chose Muir as its seventh athletic director.

Muir serves on the NCAA Division I Men's Basketball Committee, which among other duties, serves as the selection committee for the NCAA Tournament.

Personal life
Muir and his wife, Liz, have two daughters.

In December 2014, Muir was announced as one of the six recipients of the 2015 Silver Anniversary Awards, presented annually by the NCAA to outstanding former student-athletes on the 25th anniversary of the end of their college sports careers. The award is based on both athletic and professional success.

References

1968 births
Living people
African-American college athletic directors in the United States
Brown Bears men's basketball players
Ohio University alumni
Delaware Fightin' Blue Hens athletic directors
Georgetown Hoyas athletic directors
Stanford Cardinal athletic directors
People from Gainesville, Florida
American men's basketball players
21st-century African-American people
20th-century African-American sportspeople